The 2009–2010 Israeli Basketball Super League (Also known as Ligat Winner) was the 56th season of the top basketball league in Israel. The season began on 24 October 2009. The final four event was played on 25–27 May 2010.

Gilboa/Galil won its second Israeli championship.

Format

Each out of the 12 participating teams played 22 regular league games, one home game and one away game against each other team. The top eight teams qualified to the playoff, where they play best-of-5 series decided by the rankings at the end of the regular season (first against eighth, second against seventh and so on).

The four last ranked team competed in a best-of-5 series relegation playoff (9th VS 12th, 10th VS 11th) and the two losers were relegated to Liga Leumit 2010–11.

Regular season

Pld – Played; W – Won; L – Lost; PF – Points for; PA – Points against; Diff – Difference; Pts – Points.

Playoff

The higher ranked team hosts games 1, 3 and 5 (if necessary). The lower ranked team hosts games 2 and 4 (if necessary).

Final four

Relegation playoff

The higher ranked team hosts games 1, 3 and 5 (if necessary). The lower ranked team hosts games 2 and 4 (if necessary).

Ironi Ramat Gan and Ironi Nahariya were relegated to Liga Leumit.

See also
2009–10 Israeli Basketball State Cup
Winner Cup 2009

References

IBA's official website (Hebrew)

Israeli Basketball Premier League seasons
Israeli
League